Lühe (Low Saxon: Lü(h)) is a river in northern Germany in the district of Stade in Lower Saxony, Germany.

Formed at Horneburg by the confluence of the rivers Aue and Landwettern, the Lühe flows through the Altes Land, then reaching the lower reaches of the Elbe near Grünendeich.

The Lühe's course forms the border between the Second Mile and the Third Mile (territorial subdivisions) of the Altes Land. The Lühe flows through the towns and villages of:
Neuenkirchen in Altes Land, 
Guderhandviertel, 
Mittelnkirchen, and
Steinkirchen in Altes Land,

The Lühe empties near , a locality of Jork, into the Elbe.

See also
List of rivers of Lower Saxony

References

External links

Rivers of Lower Saxony
Federal waterways in Germany
Rivers of Germany